Translation movement may refer to:

Graeco-Arabic translation movement (9th–10th centuries)
Arabo-Latin translation movement (12th century)
The translation of Indian Buddhist texts into Chinese (2nd–11th centuries)
The Great Translation Movement in response to the 2022 Russian invasion of Ukraine (since February 2020)